Lists of horror film characters includes:

By character type
 List of horror film villains
 List of final girls

By series or franchise
 List of Alien (film series) characters
 List of The Texas Chainsaw Massacre characters
 List of Child's Play characters
 List of Evil Dead characters
 List of Final Destination characters
 List of Friday the 13th characters
 List of From Dusk till Dawn characters
 List of The Grudge characters
 List of Halloween (franchise) characters
 List of Hatchet characters
 List of Hellraiser characters
 List of Jurassic Park characters
 List of Let the Right One In characters
 List of The Mummy (film series) characters
 List of A Nightmare on Elm Street characters
 List of Predator (film series) characters
 List of Puppet Master characters
 List of Resident Evil film characters
 List of Ring characters
 List of Saw characters
 List of Scream (film series) characters
 List of Underworld characters

See also
 List of Scream (film series) cast members
 List of cast members of the A Nightmare on Elm Street film series
 List of Hellraiser cast members
 Lists of characters in a fictional work